The National Association for Campus Activities (NACA) is an organization designed to provide information and resources for campus activities programmers throughout the United States and Canada.  Formed in 1960, NACA links the higher education and entertainment communities in a business and learning partnership, creating educational and business opportunities for students and professional staff.

Mission & Values 
The National Association for Campus Activities (NACA) is a non-profit organization that provides knowledge, ideas and resources for campus life. It is a member-only organization that provides programs and events focused on student and professional leadership development, program planning and concert management. NACA facilitates connections between higher education institutions (called school members) and the entertainment community (called associate members), hosting events showcasing musical artists, comedians, stage shows, lecturers and other talent at regional and an annual national event. NACA's national convention provides its members with access to one of the largest campus activities networking and talent buying resources in the country.

The association's vision is to "be the recognized leader in higher education for providing the knowledge, ideas and resources to promote student learning through engagement in campus life." Its core values are stewardship, innovation, communication, respect, learning and inclusivity.

History 

 The National Association for Campus Activities began life in 1960 as a cooperative booking project in North Carolina. In 1964, after a booking meeting was held at North Carolina State University with 28 colleges and universities and 11 agencies through the Southeast in attendance, it was determined that there was a need to add showcases and educational sessions at future events.
 A two-day conference in 1965 was held at North Carolina State University and admission was $6, including registration, two lunches and coffee. Simon & Garfunkel showcase, but students do not receive them with enthusiasm.
 In 1967, after the Block Book Conference is held in Columbia, SC, the decision is made to form a national organization to share information and continue to cooperatively buy talent. The National Entertainment Conference (NEC) is formed and the first (volunteer) executive director is appointed.
 The organization is renamed National Entertainment and Campus Activities Association (NECAA) in 1976 and 11 regions are established.
 In 1982, another renaming takes place: NECAA becomes the National Association for Campus Activities. The Educational Foundation is also established to provide scholarships and grants to students and student affairs professionals.
 The regions are reduced to a seven-region configuration in 2002, and in 2017, the NACA®  Board of Trustees is formed.
 NACA published its first issue of a scholarly peer-reviewed journal in 2019 called "The Journal of Campus Activities Practice & Scholarship" (JCAPS), and it announced a newly redesigned national convention experience called "NACA® Live." It will be held in Denver in February 2020.

Events 
Each year there are seven regional conferences and one National Convention, as well as various workshops and webinars.

The National Convention is hosted each February. The four-day event provides networking opportunities with other campus activities professionals, students and the entertainment community. About 2,000 people attend the Convention each year, with hundreds of colleges and universities attending from around the United States. NACA’s National Convention is the nation's largest campus activities marketplace, hosting more than 100 live performances ranging from music and comedy to lecture and interactive programs. 

There are dozens of Educational Sessions for students and professional school staff with topics range from motivation, to leadership or event planning. These sessions focus on professional and student leadership development, programming, multicultural education, campus organization dynamics and advising, and identification of current trends in the field of campus activities. The trade show-type experience during the convention is called Campus Activities Marketplace, and it puts campus programmers in direct contact with agents and/or artists. This allows for artist meet-and-greets, product demonstrations, and experiential activities aimed at college students.

Regions 

NACA has seven regions:

The NACA® West region includes Alaska, Hawaii, Washington, Oregon, California, Nevada, Idaho, Arizona, Utah, Colorado, New Mexico, west of the 107th longitude (which roughly parallels the Rocky Mountains) and the Canadian Province of British Columbia.

The NACA® Northern Plains region includes Montana, Wyoming, Wisconsin, the Upper Peninsula of Michigan, Nebraska, Iowa, Minnesota, North Dakota, South Dakota, and the Canadian Provinces of Alberta, Saskatchewan, Manitoba, and western Ontario. 

The NACA® Mid America region includes Michigan, Indiana, Ohio, West Virginia, Kentucky, and Illinois.

The NACA® South region includes Virginia (south of metro Washington DC), North Carolina, South Carolina, Georgia, Florida, Alabama, Tennessee, Mississippi, and US & British Virgin Islands.

The NACA® Mid Atlantic region includes New York, Pennsylvania, New Jersey, Delaware, Maryland, Washington DC (and the surrounding metro area) and the Canadian Province of eastern Ontario.

The NACA® Northeast region includes Maine, New Hampshire, Vermont, Massachusetts, Rhode Island, Connecticut, and the Canadian Provinces of New Brunswick and Quebec. 

The NACA® Central region includes Colorado and New Mexico east of the 107th longitude (which roughly parallels the Rocky Mountains), Kansas, Oklahoma, Missouri, Texas, Arkansas, and Louisiana.

References

External links 
 

Education-related professional associations
Organizations based in Ohio
Organizations based in Columbia, South Carolina
1960 establishments in the United States